Lonneke Uneken (born 2 March 2000) is a Dutch professional racing cyclist, who currently rides for UCI Women's WorldTeam .

Major results
2017
 5th Gent–Wevelgem Juniors
2018
 2nd Gent–Wevelgem Juniors
 3rd Overall Healthy Ageing Tour Juniors
1st  Points classification
1st Stages 1 & 3
 3rd Road race, National Junior Road Championships
 4th Overall Watersley Ladies Challenge
2019
 3rd Road race, UEC European Under-23 Road Championships
 3rd Flanders Ladies Classic
 5th GP Stad Roeselare Juniors
 6th Omloop van de IJsseldelta
 9th Road race, National Under–23 Road Championships
2020
 2nd Road race, UEC European Under-23 Road Championships
 7th Le Samyn des Dames
2021
 1st Stage 3 Holland Ladies Tour
 4th Overall Healthy Ageing Tour
1st  Mountains classification
1st Stage 3
 6th Drentse Acht van Westerveld
 6th Dwars door het Hagel and Women 
 10th Overall BeNe Ladies Tour
1st  Points classification
 1st Stage 3
2022
 1st Stage 2 Bloeizone Fryslân Tour
 4th Classic Brugge–De Panne

References

External links
 

2000 births
Living people
Dutch female cyclists
People from Winschoten
Cyclists from Groningen (province)
21st-century Dutch women